Ruben van Heerden (born 27 October 1997) is a South African rugby union player for Stormers in European United Rugby Championship, he previously played for the  in Super Rugby and in the Currie Cup. His regular position is lock.

References

South African rugby union players
Living people
1997 births
People from Alberton, Gauteng
Rugby union locks
Blue Bulls players
Bulls (rugby union) players
South Africa Under-20 international rugby union players
Rugby union players from Gauteng
Sharks (Currie Cup) players
Sharks (rugby union) players
Exeter Chiefs players
Stormers players
Western Province (rugby union) players